Velia saulii  is a Palearctic species of true bug. It is aquatic.

References

External links
Aquatic heteroptera recording scheme for Britain and Ireland

Gerrini
Hemiptera of Europe
Insects described in 1947